Mohammad Heidari (January 1937 – August 23, 2016) was a Persian santur player and songwriter.

Career

After the 1979 Iranian Revolution, Mohammad Heidari left the country for Italy and a few years later moved to Los Angeles, where he continued his activities as a soloist and songwriter. Some of his nostalgic songs such as "Zahr-e Jodai" and "Bahar Bahar" (both performed by Hayedeh) became popular in the Persian community. Heyidari also has written the melody of other Persian hit songs such as Bia Benevisim and Sobhet Bekheir Azizam.

Death
Mohammad Heyidari died from cancer in a hospital in Los Angeles on 23 August 2016, aged 79.

References
 Akbarzadeh, P. "Persian Musicians" (Vol. 2), Roshanak Publications, Tehran, 2003.
 محمد حیدری آهنگ‌ساز 'وقتی میای صدای پات' درگذشت BBC Persian
 خزان آهنگساز "بهار بهار"؛ محمد حیدری درگذشت, VOA
 محمد حیدری؛ پیشگام در تلفیق موسیقی سنتی و پاپ BBC Persian

1939 births
2016 deaths
Iranian santur players
Iranian songwriters
People from Tehran
Iranian emigrants to the United States
Exiles of the Iranian Revolution in Italy
Exiles of the Iranian Revolution in the United States